Black Star International film festival (BSIFF) is a non-profit festival in Ghana founded by Juliet Asante in 2015. It is a festival celebrated annually to bridge the gap between  African movie cinema and the global community of movie makers and focuses on the business aspect of film making.

Activities 
The festival is celebrated for a week and it coupled with several activities which are Workshop, Panel Session, African Film Market, A music concert, Awards night and daily film screenings. During these activities participant or industry players network  do business and also celebrate Africans for their works over the year.

Themes 
List of theme from the year of inception to date

References 

Film festivals in Ghana
Non-profit organisations based in Ghana
International organizations based in Africa